RakNet is networking middleware developed by Oculus VR, Inc.  for use in the video game industry. RakNet was originally authored by Jenkins Software LLC.

Overview
RakNet is a C++ class library that provides UDP and reliable TCP transport. It contains several core systems that rely on the transport layer: object replication; Remote procedure call in C++ using Boost C++ Libraries; VoIP supporting FMOD, DirectSound, and PortAudio; NAT traversal; and Patch.

Its source was available without charge for games grossing under $100,000 allowing use by developers of indie or free/open source games.

On July 7, 2014, RakNet was bought by Oculus VR who released the source code for PCs, under the BSD licence with a patent granting license.

Supported operating systems
 Microsoft Windows
 PlayStation 3
 PlayStation 4
 Xbox 360
 Xbox One
 Games for Windows – Live
 PlayStation Vita
 Linux
 macOS
 iOS
 Android with Cygwin
 Windows CE
 Nintendo Switch

Integrated Technology Partners
Game Engines
 Unity
 Roblox

Other middleware
 Scaleform
 Steamworks

References

External links
 

Free software
Formerly proprietary software
Free software programmed in C++
Games for Windows
Linux APIs
Middleware
Multiplayer video game services
Software using the BSD license
Video game engines